Sid Phillips may refer to:
 Sidney Phillips (1924–2015), American physician and US Marine
 Sid Phillips (musician) (1907–1973), English jazz musician
 Sid Phillips (Toy Story), the main antagonist in the film Toy Story